The Azerbaijan Cup 2003–04 was the 12th season of the annual cup competition in Azerbaijan with the final taking place on 9 May 2004. Twenty teams competed in this year's competition. Neftchi Baku were the defending champions.

First round 
The first legs were played on September 20, 2003 and the second legs on October 5, 2003.

|}

Round of 16
The first legs were played on October 18 and 19, 2003 and the second legs on November 1 and 2, 2003.

|}

Quarterfinals 
The first legs were played on March 17, 2004 and the second legs on March 23, 2004.

|}

Semifinals 
The first legs were played on April 14, 2004 and the second legs on April 22, 2004.

|}

Final

References

External links
Azerbaijan Cup
Azerbaijan Cup '03 RSSSF

Azerbaijan Cup seasons
Cup
Azerbaijan Cup